The Kivalliq Region (Inuktitut syllabics: ᑭᕙᓪᓕᖅ ) is an administrative region of Nunavut, Canada. It consists of the portion of the mainland to the west of Hudson Bay together with Southampton Island and Coats Island. The regional centre is Rankin Inlet. The population was 10,413 in the 2016 Census, an increase of 16.3% from the 2011 Census.

Before 1999, Kivalliq Region existed under slightly different boundaries as Keewatin Region, Northwest Territories. Although the Kivalliq name became official in 1999, Statistics Canada has continued to refer to the area as Keewatin Region, Nunavut in publications such as the Census. Most references to the area as "Keewatin" have generally been phased out by Nunavut-based bodies, as that name was originally rooted in a region of northwestern Ontario derived from a Cree dialect, and only saw application onto Inuit-inhabited lands because of the boundaries of the now-defunct District of Keewatin.

Geology

Communities

Hamlets and population
Arviat (2,657)
Baker Lake (2,069}
Chesterfield Inlet (437)
Coral Harbour (891)
Naujaat (1,082)
Rankin Inlet (2,842}
Whale Cove (435)

Former
Ennadai
Padlei
Wager Bay
Cape Fullerton
Maguse River
Tavani

The remainder of the region is referred to as Keewatin, Unorganized by Statistics Canada.

Climate
The Kivalliq Region has a subarctic climate (Köppen climate classification Dfc) and a tundra climate (ET). However, it is almost entirely above the tree line. Days are much longer in summer than in winter.

Protected areas

Arvia'juaq and Qikiqtaarjuk National Historic Site
East Bay Migratory Bird Sanctuary
Fall Caribou Crossing National Historic Site
Harry Gibbons Migratory Bird Sanctuary
Iqalugaarjuup Nunanga Territorial Park
Inuujarvik Territorial Park
McConnell River Migratory Bird Sanctuary
Thelon Wildlife Sanctuary

Demographics

References

Further reading

Aldene Meis Mason, Leo Paul Dana, and Robert Brent Anderson, "Entrepreneurship in Coral Harbour, Nunavut" International Journal of Entrepreneurship and Innovation 9 (2), June 2008, pp. 1–10.
Aldene Meis Mason, Leo Paul Dana, and Robert Brent Anderson, "A Study of Enterprise in Rankin Inlet, Nunavut: Where Subsistence Self-employment Meets Formal Entrepreneurship," International Journal of Entrepreneurship and Small Business 7 (1), January 2009, pp. 1–23.
Aldene Meis Mason, Leo Paul Dana, Robert Brent Anderson, "The Inuit Commercial Caribou Harvest and Related Agri-Food Industries in Nunavut," International Journal of Entrepreneurship and Small Business 4 (6) 2007, pp. 785–806.
 Brown, Marc Allen. Towards Contextually Appropriate Planning Practice Evaluating the Role of Planning in the Kivalliq Community Planning Project. Ottawa: Library and Archives Canada = Bibliothèque et Archives Canada, 2005. 
 Dredge, L. A., and I. McMartin. Postglacial marine deposits and marine limit determinations, inner Wager Bay area, Kivalliq region, Nunavut. [Ottawa]: Geological Survey of Canada, 2005. 
 Loughery S, A Macaulay, M Fricke, A Durcan, and J Cooper. 2004. "Speech Language Pathology Services in Kivalliq Region of Nunavut, Canada". International Journal of Circumpolar Health. 63: 120–3.
 McMartin, I., and L. A. Dredge. History of ice flow in the Schultz Lake and Wager Bay areas, Kivalliq region, Nunavut. Ottawa, Ont: Geological Survey of Canada, 2005. 
 Upstairs Gallery (Winnipeg). Nunavut Celebrated Sculptures from Nunavut with Emphasis on Older Works from the Kivalliq (Keewatin) Region. Winnipeg: Upstairs Gallery, 1999.

External links
 Kivalliq Region information at Explore Nunavut
 kivalliq.com - photos, information, links from Rankin Inlet Nunavut

 
Census divisions of Nunavut